AA Films is an Indian motion picture distribution company, owned by Anil Thadani. It mainly distributes Hindi films and Hindi-dubbed South Indian films in North India.

Background
AA Films was founded by Anil Thadani in 1993. It independently distributes films in India. Anil Thadani was awarded with "The distribution personality of the year" in 2017. Afterwards, it has a joint venture with Cineestan Film Company. The JV is named "Cineestan AA Distributors". Anil Thadani is the managing Director and CEO of the JV and Rohit Khattar, founder Chairman of Cinestaan, is the Chairman of the JV.

Films distributed

Film soundtracks released

Films presented

References

Film distributors of India
Indian companies established in 2008

External links